Colleen Wolfe (born January 2, 1985 in Philadelphia, Pennsylvania) is an on-air talent for the NFL Network. She hosts a variety of shows on the network including the weekend version of Good Morning Football and NFL GameDay Kickoff before Thursday Night Football.

Early life
Colleen is from Horsham, Pennsylvania and graduated from Drexel University majoring in Communications.

Career
She worked for WTXF-TV, Comcast SportsNet Philadelphia, and Sports Radio 94 WIP-FM prior to joining NFL Network in 2014. Colleen has experience as a production assistant, associate producer, booking producer, line producer, show producer, reporter, host, writer, analyst, photographer and editor. She's worked for production companies, local news, a regional sports network and a national sports network across both broadcast and digital platforms. Wolfe was named to The Big Lead's 40 under 40 Sports Media Talent list in 2019, ranked 33rd. Wolfe is a frequent guest of the Around the NFL Podcast produced by NFL.com.

Personal life
Wolfe was engaged to sportswriter John Gonzalez in 2010 and married a year later. Sometimes they appear on NFL Network's Top 10 program either together or separate. She is a Philadelphia Eagles fan. In her spare time, Wolfe rescues animals and brings them home. While covering the Oakland Raiders during Training Camp in 2017 with Michael Robinson, Robinson's ex-teammate Marshawn Lynch stopped by to talk with Robinson and Wolfe and Lynch asked out Wolfe before checking her hand where her wedding ring was.

References

External links

Colleen Wolfe profile at NFL

1985 births
Living people
American sports journalists
Drexel University alumni
People from Montgomery County, Pennsylvania
Women sports journalists